Horace Moore may refer to:

 Horace Ladd Moore (1837–1914), U.S. Representative from Kansas
 Horace Moore (American football) (1926–2005), American football coach